Hirschegg-Pack is since 2015 a municipality with 1,054 residents (as of 1 January 2016) in Voitsberg District in Styria in Austria.
It was created as part of the Styria municipal structural reform,
at the end of 2014, by merging the former towns Hirschegg and Pack.

Geography
Pack liest west of Graz near Pack Pass, on the border between Styria and Carinthia.

Municipality arrangement 
The municipality territory includes the following two sections (population as of 1 January 2016):
 Hirschegg (651)
 Pack (403)

The municipality consists of the Katastralgemeinden Hirschegg-Piber, Hirschegg-Rein and Pack.

Politics 
The town council, with 15 members, was voted in 2015 as the following portions: 11 ÖVP, 3 SPÖ, 1 FPÖ.

Mayor

 2018 Johann Schmid (ÖVP)
 2015-2018 Gottfried Preßler (ÖVP)

Culture and sights 
Hirschegg
 Pfarrkirche Hirschegg
Pack
 Schloss Pack
 Pfarrkirche Pack
 Freiländer Alm
 Hebalm und Hebalmkapelle

Tourism 
The two sections Hirschegg and Pack joined with the places Edelschrott, Modriach and St. Martin am Wöllmißberg as the tourism agency Steirische Rucksackdörfer.

References

External links 

Cities and towns in Voitsberg District